Santiago Gabriel Salcedo González (born 6 September 1981), nicknamed "Sa-Sa", is a Paraguayan association football player currently playing for General Caballero JLM in Primera División Paraguaya.

Salcedo is the maximum goal scorer in the history of the Primera División Paraguaya, and Paraguayan football with 152 goals, ahead of Hernan Rodrigo Lopez (127), Juan Eduardo Samudio (119) and Fredy Bareiro (112).

Salcedo ranked number 10 in a list of the most expensive players in Paraguayan football for 2015 published by Diario Extra.

Career
Salcedo was the top scorer of the 2005 Copa Libertadores playing for Paraguayan side Cerro Porteño. He scored nine goals in the competition. The striker then played for FC Tokyo of Japan, but was loaned in the second half of 2006 to Newell's Old Boys of Argentina, after having problems with his coach Alexandre Gallo at FC Tokyo. Salcedo was then loaned to Mexican side Chiapas for the 2007 Clausura, but returned to Newell's Old Boys for the start of the 2007–08 season. After scoring nine goals during the 2008 Clausura (including the winning goal against Rosario Central in the Rosario derby), he joined River Plate by request of coach Diego Simeone.

After the departure of Simeone and River finishing in the last place of the 2008 Apertura, Salcedo returned to Newell's for the 2009 Clausura tournament. On 7 August 2009, Lanús signed the Paraguayan striker on a joint-ownership deal.

After a short spell in Argentinos Juniors he returned to Cerro Porteño. Salcedo was considered by Hércules to be David Trezeguet's replacement following the 2010/11 season. Salcedo was recommended by national team colleague, Nelson Haedo Valdez, who at the time was playing at Hercules.

On 5 August 2013, Santiago signed for Club Atlético Banfield on loan from Cerro Porteño, competing in Primera B Nacional of Argentina.

On 1 January 2016, Salcedo was transferred to Club Libertad for the 2016 Primera División Paraguaya season after being on loan to Sol de América from Cerro Porteño in 2015.

In January 2021, it was announced that Salcedo would continue his career in Paraguay's second-tier with Sportivo San Lorenzo. He will be coached by his brother, Jose Domingo Salcedo, and Salcedo opted to stay at Sportivo San Lorenzo to give the club promotion back to the first-tier.

In December 2021, Salcedo's return to the Primera División in 2022 was confirmed when the 40-year-old was announced as a signing for newly promoted General Caballero JLM. Already with 152 goals in Paraguay's top-tier, Salcedo commented that he wished to be the league's leading goal scorer in 2022. On 9 January 2022 of Paraguay's summer transfer window, Salcedo's transfer was officially complete.

Club statistics

National team statistics

Honours

Individual
 Maximum goal scorer of Paraguayan football with 152 goals

See also
 Players and Records in Paraguayan Football

References

External links
 
 Argentine Primera statistics at Fútbol XXI  
 
 

1981 births
Living people
Paraguayan footballers
Paraguayan expatriate footballers
Paraguay international footballers
Paraguay under-20 international footballers
Cerro Porteño players
MKE Ankaragücü footballers
Newell's Old Boys footballers
Club Atlético River Plate footballers
Club Atlético Lanús footballers
Argentinos Juniors footballers
FC Tokyo players
Chiapas F.C. footballers
Club Atlético Banfield footballers
Club Sol de América footballers
Club Libertad footballers
Deportivo Capiatá players
Club Sportivo San Lorenzo footballers
J1 League players
Paraguayan Primera División players
Argentine Primera División players
Süper Lig players
Liga MX players
Primera Nacional players
Paraguayan expatriate sportspeople in Argentina
Paraguayan expatriate sportspeople in Japan
Paraguayan expatriate sportspeople in Turkey
Paraguayan expatriate sportspeople in Mexico
Expatriate footballers in Argentina
Expatriate footballers in Japan
Expatriate footballers in Turkey
Expatriate footballers in Mexico
Association football forwards